The Hudson River Bracketed architectural style was originated by architect Alexander Jackson Davis.  An example of his implementation is in Oliver Bronson House, a National Historic Landmark built for Dr. Oliver Bronson.  Another example is the Rombout House at Poughkeepsie, New York, added to the National Register of Historic Places in 1982.

In popular culture
Hudson River Bracketed is the title of one of American writer Edith Wharton's latter novels, published in 1929.

References

American architectural styles